KNOX may refer to:

 KNOX (AM), a radio station (1310 AM) licensed to Grand Forks, North Dakota, United States
 KNOX-FM, the former call letters of KZGF, a radio station (94.7 FM) licensed to Grand Forks, North Dakota, United States
 KNOX (genes), a family of genes in plants which control morphology, including of leaves and flowers
 KNOX (candles), a traditional incense firm in Saxony, Germany
 Samsung KNOX, an enterprise mobile security solution

See also
 Knox (disambiguation)